Ahn Shin-ae (born 18 December 1990 in Seoul) is a South Korean professional golfer.

References

External links 

South Korean female golfers
LPGA of Korea Tour golfers
Golfers from Seoul
LPGA of Japan Tour golfers
1990 births
Living people